Andrea Temesvári (born 26 April 1966) is a former professional tennis player from Hungary. She won the Italian Open at age sixteen, but injuries would later hamper her career.

Born in Budapest, Temesvári began playing tennis at age nine. She was coached by her father, Otto Temesvári, and Ferenc Polyak.

Career
She joined the WTA Tour in 1981, and was awarded Most Improved Player Award by WTA Tour and TENNIS Magazine in 1982. Temesvári reached a career-high of world No. 7 in 1983. After several injuries, she made a comeback after dropping out of top 25 for first time since 1983 in 1986. At the 1986 French Open, she won the doubles title with Martina Navratilova.

She returned to the tour 1989 after a 20-month layoff due to ankle and shoulder injuries. She had two operations on ankle in March and September 1987 and then arthroscopic surgery on right shoulder in April 1988. She played for the Hungary Fed Cup team from 1983 to 1986, 1989 to 1990, and 1992. She was also a member of the Hungarian Olympic team in 1996. She retired in 1997.

During her career she won a total of five singles titles and seven doubles titles.

Grand Slam finals

Doubles: 1 title

WTA career finals

Singles: 7 (5 titles, 2 runner-ups)

Doubles: 10 (7 titles, 3 runner-ups)

ITF finals

Singles (3–2)

Doubles (4–1)

Grand Slam singles performance timeline

External links
 
 
 
 
 
 

1966 births
Living people
Hungarian female tennis players
Olympic tennis players of Hungary
Tennis players at the 1996 Summer Olympics
Tennis players from Budapest
French Open champions
Grand Slam (tennis) champions in women's doubles